AMETEK, Inc. is an American multinational conglomerate and global designer and manufacturer of electronic instruments and electromechanical devices with headquarters in the United States and over 220 sites worldwide.

The company was founded in 1930. The company's original name, American Machine and Metals, was changed to AMETEK in the early 1960s, reflecting its evolution from a provider of heavy machinery to a manufacturer of analytical instruments, precision components and specialty materials.

AMETEK has been ranked as high as 402 on the Fortune 500. The firm has also consistently been on the Fortune 1000 rankings list as well as the Fortune Global 2000. 

The overall strategy for the organization is made up of 4 components: Operational Excellence (cost control), New Product Development, International/Market Expansion, and Acquisitions. 

The firm has two operating groups (the Electronic Instruments Group and the Electromechanical Group). Together, these groups and their divisions comprise over 100 brands, including analytical instruments, monitoring, testing and calibration devices as well as electrical motors, pumps and interconnects. The company's headquarters are in Berwyn, Pennsylvania.

AMETEK is listed on the New York Stock Exchange. Its common stock is a component of the S&P 500 index and the Russell 1000 index.

Acquisition history 
History prior to 1999 is incomplete.

Divisions 
Abaco

Rugged embedded electronics used in various industries.

Aerospace & Defense

Engine and avionics. Other aviation products and components.

Creaform 

Creaform manufactures metrology and 3D engineering devices for use in shop-floor environments It is based in Lévis, Quebec, Canada.  The company was founded in 2002 by Martin Lamontagne and two co-workers at Modelex. It began with a $200,000 loan from the Business Development Bank of Canada.  In 2009, the company sold its 1000th laser scanner, priced from $50 –100,000. Creaform was acquired by Ametek in 2013 for $120 million in cash. At the time, Creaform had annual sales of $52 million. In 2017, Creaform opened a new, $20 million, headquarters in Levis. The 76,000 square foot  headquarters is double the size of the old one, allowing Creaform to triple its production.

Heavy Vehicle and OEM

Motors, blowers, pumps, and other parts for heavy trucks and vehicles.

Materials Analysis and Imaging

Includes imaging products used in TV and movie production and tools such as Ion Mass spectrometers, electron Probe Microanalysis, Low-energy electron induced X-ray emission spectrometry, and atom Probe tomography.

Rauland

Healthcare (hospitals) and Education (schools) communication systems.

Oil & Gas / Power

Products for use in refineries and labs. Includes process analyzers, fuel analyzers, sample conditioning and heated and jacketed tubing.

References

External links

 

 Ametek website
 Company profile at Reuters
 Company history at Fundinguniverse
 Creaform website

1930 establishments in Pennsylvania
American companies established in 1930
Companies based in Chester County, Pennsylvania
Companies listed on the New York Stock Exchange
Conglomerate companies of the United States
Manufacturing companies based in Pennsylvania
American brands